Valli Thirumanam ( Valli's Marriage) is a 2022 Indian-Tamil-language Romantic comedy Family drama television series, starring Nachathira and Shyam. The show is produced by 4th Wall Media Works LLP of Karthik Jayaram and Pradeep Athinarayanan, that was premiered on 3 January 2022 and ended on 9 December 2022 with 275 episodes and aired on Colors Tamil  and is also digitally available on Voot.

Plot
The story follows the life of a mischievous girl Valli (Nachathira) who is a bold and arrogant money lender. Karthik (R.Shyam) a soft, Kind-hearted man searches for a bride who has the same quality as he does. Vadivu (Nalini), Valli's mother wants Valli to marry Karthik, as Vadivu thinks he was a good suitor for Valli. Due to Vadivu's compulsion, Valli projects herself as a soft girl and enters the life of Karthik. The rest of story concentrates on the marriage life of Valli.

Cast

Main 
 Nachathira as Valli Karthik 
Karthik's wife and Vadivu's daughter, strict and she tries all the tricks to get her money back from the lenders.
R. Shyam as Karthik
Valli's husband and Vasundhara's younger brother, is courteous and soft-spoken. He wants his better half to have the same attributes as he does.

Recurring

Special appearances
Shwetha Bandekar as Bhoomika

References

External links 

Colors Tamil original programming
Tamil-language romance television series
2022 Tamil-language television series debuts
Tamil-language television shows
Television shows set in Tamil Nadu
2022 Tamil-language television series endings